The Milion ( or , Míllion) was a monument erected in the early 4th century AD in Constantinople (modern-day Istanbul, Turkey). It was the Byzantine zero-mile marker, the starting-place for the measurement of distances for all the roads leading to the cities of the Byzantine Empire. It thus served the same function as the Golden Milestone in Rome's forum. The domed building of the Milion rested on four large arches, and it was expanded and decorated with several statues and paintings. It survived the Fourth Crusade and Ottoman conquest of Constantinople in 1453 but had disappeared by the start of the 16th century. During excavations in the 1960s, some partial fragments of it were discovered under houses in the area.

Location
The remains of the monument are located in Istanbul, in the district of Eminönü, in the neighborhood of Cağaloğlu, at the northern corner of the square of Hagia Sophia, and close to the Basilica Cistern.

History and description

When Emperor Constantine I the Great rebuilt the city of Byzantium to make it his new imperial capital, which he named Nova Roma ("New Rome"), he consciously emulated many of the features of "Old Rome". Among these was the Milion: it was a tetrapylon surmounted by a dome, built in the first Region of the city, near the old Walls of Byzantium, at the very beginning of the main thoroughfare of the new city, the Mese (Μέση Οδός), which at that point formed a bend. The new building fulfilled the same role as the Milliarium Aureum in Rome: it was considered as the origin of all the roads leading to the European cities of the Byzantine Empire, and on its base were inscribed the distances of all the main cities of the Empire from Constantinople. The monument was just west of the Augustaeum, and was much more complex than its Roman counterpart. It can be described as a double triumphal arch surmounted by a dome, which was carried by four arches. It was crowned by the statues of Constantine and his mother Helena with a cross, looking towards the east, between them. A statue of the Tyche of the City stood behind them. 

From the beginning of the sixth century, the building became an increasingly important station of the imperial ceremonial. Justinian I added to it a Sundial, while Justin II adorned the lower part with the statues of his wife Sophia, his daughter Arabia and his niece Helena . The monument was also adorned with equestrian sculptures of Trajan, Hadrian, Theodosius II and a bronze Quadriga of Helios.
During the first half of the eighth century, the vaults of the building were adorned by Emperors Philippikos and Anastasios II with paintings of past ecumenical councils, but during the Iconoclastic Age, Emperor Constantine V replaced them with scenes from the Hippodrome.

During the Comnenian Age, the Milion, due to its strategic position, witnessed fights in the city, like those between Nikephoros III and Alexios I, or those between imperial troops and Empress Maria of Antioch, who from this position was controlling the Augustaeum.

In the period 1268 to 1271, after the end of the Latin Empire, the Milion—together with the Augustaeum—became the property of the church of Hagia Sophia. 

After the Ottoman conquest of Constantinople (1453), the building remained intact up to the end of the fifteenth century. 
It disappeared possibly at the beginning of the sixteenth century because of the enlargement of the nearby aqueduct and the subsequent erection of the nearby suterazi (Turkish: "water tower", lit. "water scale").

In the years 1967 and 1968, following theoretical studies about the location of the monument and after the demolition of the houses placed above it, excavations revealed some foundations and a fragment (now re-erected as a pillar) belonging to the building. These remains could be positively identified as belonging to the Milion thanks to their vicinity to a part of bent Byzantine canalization. This seems to indicate the angle of the disappeared Mese, as reported by the literary sources.

See also 
 Umbilicus urbis Romae

References

Sources

External links 

 3D reconstruction at the Byzantium1200 project

Buildings and structures completed in the 4th century
Constantinople
Byzantine secular architecture
Kilometre-zero markers
Fatih
Obelisks in Istanbul